This is a list of programs currently broadcast or will air soon or formerly aired on VH1.

Current

Acquired programming
48 Hours
Cheaters
Eve
The Fresh Prince of Bel-Air
The Jamie Foxx Show
Living Single
My Wife and Kids 
The Wayans Bros.

Former

Scripted programming
Single Ladies
Hit The Floor
Hindsight
The Breaks
Daytime Divas
Strange Frequency

Acquired programming

8-Track Flashback
America's Next Top Model
American Bandstand
Armed & Famous
Bands on the Run
Beauty and the Geek
Beavis and Butt-Head
Behind the Music
Black to the Future
Bridal Bootcamp
Bye Felicia 
Can't Get a Date
Celebrity Eye Candy
Chappelle's Show
The Cher Show
The Cho Show
The Cleveland Show
Click!
Confessions of a Teen Idol
Cover Wars
Dance Cam Slam
Darcy's Music
Don't Forget the Lyrics
Driven
Entertainment Tonight 
The Fabulous Life of...
Free Radio
Gene Simmons' Rock School
Girlfriends
The Great Debate
The Greatest...
Happy Endings
Hard Rock Live
Hip Hop Honors
Hollywood Snappers
Hot Grits 
I Know My Kid's a Star
I Love the 2000s
I Love the '70s
I Love the '70s: Volume 2
I Love the '80s
I Love the '80s 3-D
I Love the '80s Strikes Back
I Love the '90s
I Love the '90s: Part Deux
I Love the Holidays
I Love the New Millennium
I Love Toys
In Living Color
In Search of The Partridge Family
The Jackson 5ive
John Mayer Has a TV Show
Kept
Key & Peele
LeAnn & Eddie
Legends
The List
Lords of the Revolution
Love Monkey
Luke's Parental Advisory
Make or Break: The Linda Perry Project
Making Mr. Right
Mario Lopez: Saved by the Baby
Martin
Masters of the Mix
Matzo and Metal
Maxim Hot 100
Miami Vice
The Midnight Special
 The Mindy Project
Model Employee
Money Hungry
Most Awesomely Bad
My Antonio
My Big Friggin' Wedding
My Generation
My VH1 Music Awards
Name That Video
Never Mind the Buzzcocks
 New Girl
Nocturnal State
Off Pitch
Old Skool with Terry and Gita
The Partridge Family (remake)
Really Rich Real Estate
Red Hot Red Carpet
Redlight, Greenlight
The Ren & Stimpy Show
Retrosexual: The '80s
Rock & Roll Jeopardy!
Rock Bodies
Rock Honors
Rotten TV
Rumor Has It
RuPaul's Drag Race
Saddle Ranch
 Saturday Night Live
 Saved by the Bell
Scream Queens
Sex Rehab with Dr. Drew
The Shot
Sister, Sister
Sober House
Solid Gold
Sorority Sisters
SoundClash
South of Sunset
Stand-Up Spotlight 
Strange Love
Strip Search
 Suave Says
Supergroup
The Surreal Life
Surviving Nugent
The T.O. Show
That '70s Show
This Is Hot 97
Tiny & Shekinah's Weave Trip
Ton of Cash
Tool Academy
Totally Awesome
Totally Gay!
Totally Obsessed
Tough Love
Trapped in the Closet
TV's Illest Minority Moments
Undatable
VH1 All Access
VH1 Dance Machine
VH1 Divas
VH1 Goes Inside...
VH1 Storytellers
VH1 Top 20 Video Countdown
VH1 Unplugged
VH1 Video Music Awards
Vibe Awards
Web Junk 20
Wedding Wars
The Wendy Williams Experience
When __ Ruled the World
The X-Life
Ultimate Albums

References

VH1